Villanueva del Duque is a town located in the province of Córdoba, Spain. In 2014 census, the town has a population of 1580 inhabitants.

References

External links
Official Web of VILLANUEVA DEL DUQUE
News about VILLANUEVA DEL DUQUE
RadioGuía in http://www.villanuevadelduque.com 
Villanueva del Duque - Sistema de Información Multiterritorial de Andalucía

Municipalities in the Province of Córdoba (Spain)